Protocatechuic aldehyde is a phenolic aldehyde, a compound released from cork stoppers into wine.

This molecule can be used as a precursor in the vanillin synthesis by biotransformation by cell cultures of Capsicum frutescens, a type of Chili pepper. It is also found in the mushroom Phellinus linteus.

Pharmacological effects  
Protocatechuic aldehyde regulates G protein-coupled estrogen receptor-1 (GPER-1) and exhibits protective effects in endothelial dysfunction and atherosclerosis.

References

See also 
 Phenolic compounds in wine

Hydroxybenzaldehydes